The North Carolina United States Senate election of 1978 was held on November 7, 1978 as part of the nationwide elections to the Senate.  The general election was between the Republican incumbent Jesse Helms and the Democratic nominee John Ingram.  Helms won re-election, by a slightly wider margin than in 1972.

Republican primary

Candidates
Jesse Helms, incumbent Senator since 1973

Results
Jesse Helms won the Republican Party's nomination unopposed.

Democratic primary

Candidates
Lawrence Davis
William Griffin
Joe Felmet, Winston-Salem Journal editorialist, civil rights activist, and candidate for U.S. House in 1974
Luther H. Hodges Jr., chairman of North Carolina National Bank and son of former U.S. Secretary of Commerce Luther Hodges
John Ingram, North Carolina Commissioner of Insurance since 1973
Dave McKnight
Tom Sawyer
McNeill Smith, State Senator from Greensboro

Results

General election

Candidates
Jesse Helms, U.S. Senator since 1973 (Republican)
John Ingram (Democratic)

Results

See also 
 1978 United States Senate elections

References 

1978
North Carolina
Jesse Helms
1978 North Carolina elections